"Wait" is the first single by the American producer Chantel Jeffries. It was released for digital download on May 2, 2018, as the first single from her first extended play, Calculated Luck, by the Universal Music Group label, 10:22 pm. The track has guest vocals from the American rappers Offset and Vory.

Background
Shortly after being signed to 10:22 pm, it was announced that Jeffries would release a single on May 4, 2018. The track features the American rappers Offset and Vory, who  heard the track and wanted to "lay some melodies".

Music video
A vertical music video for "Wait" was released on June 5, 2018. The official music video was released but later deleted after a complaint from fans that it featured Alissa Violet and her ex-boyfriend Jake Paul.

Charts

Weekly charts

Year-end charts

References

External links

2018 songs
2018 debut singles
Offset (rapper) songs
Songs written by Louis Bell
Songs written by Offset (rapper)
Songs written by Vory